Duford Field  is a privately owned, public use airport located one nautical mile (2 km) northwest of the central business district of Genesee, in Genesee County, Michigan, United States.

Facilities and aircraft 
Duford Field covers an area of 30 acres (12 ha) at an elevation of 773 feet (236 m) above mean sea level. It has one runway, designated 18/36. It has a turf surface and measures 3,068 by 100 feet (935 x 30 m).

For the 12-month period ending December 31, 2009, the airport had 100 general aviation aircraft operations.

References

External links 
 Aerial image as of March 1999 from USGS The National Map

Airports in Michigan
Transportation in Genesee County, Michigan